Andrew McPhillips is a British film director and computer graphics supervisor.

Film career
Andrew has a background in film and photography. His professional experience includes a five-year stint at PDI/DreamWorks, where he worked on films such as Shrek 2, Minority Report and Artificial Intelligence: AI. More recently, he's been working as a Computer Graphics Supervisor at animation studios such as Sony Picture Imageworks, Method Studios, The Moving Picture Company, Toonbox Entertainment and LAIKA, working on a number of films including The Maze Runner, Hotel Transylvania 2 and The Great Gatsby.

His short film Blood Will Tell was invited to World Première at the 2007 Toronto International Film Festival. The short film had a lot of success in the festival circuit, eventually winning the coveted, Grand Jury Award at Slamdance Film Festival.

The year long festival screenings culminated in Blood Will Tell being selected for a prestigious four week, exclusive run at the IFC Film Center in New York. Held in Park City, Utah. He received a $2,500 credit at Filmworks/FX for winning the Slamdance Grand Jury award.

References

External links
Facebook

Interviews
New waves in animation
  Interview

English film directors
British film directors
Living people
Year of birth missing (living people)